Harry Stone may refer to:

Harry Stone (boxer) (1893–1950), American boxer
Harry Stone (footballer) (born 2002), Scottish footballer
Judge Harry Stone, the lead character on Night Court, an American situation comedy television show